David Jamieson (born  in Scotland) is a Scottish former rugby union player who played for Glasgow Warriors at the Tighthead Prop position, although he can also play Hooker

Rugby Union career

Amateur career

Jamieson's rugby career spanned the amateur and professional era. In 1995 before professionalism was introduced in Scotland - Scotland taking up professional rugby a year later for the 1996-97 season - he was playing for West of Scotland.

When Jamieson signed for Glasgow Warriors the Prop was playing for West of Scotland.

Whilst not involved with the professional provincial Glasgow side in the 1997-98 season, Jamieson played amateur rugby with Stirling County.

In 2000, he was back at West of Scotland and played at the opening of West's new stand at Burnbrae. However at the start of the 2000-2001 season, following West's demotion to Division 2, he was one of 14 players that staged a walk-out of the club. He then signed for Ayr RFC.

By 2002, Jamieson was playing at Glasgow Hutchesons Aloysians. but they also got relegated to Division 2 in 2005.

In 2010, the prop was now playing at Falkirk RFC

By 2013, Jamieson was playing for the Grangemouth Stags. They played in the RBS Bowl Final against Oban Lorne that year.

Professional and provincial career

In 1995 he was also being selected for the Under 21 Glasgow District side They won the Championship in 1995-96. By the end of 1995, Jamieson was on the bench for the full Glasgow District side.

Jamieson played for Glasgow in the 1997-98 season. He was on the bench in the pre-season friendly match against the Australian Super Rugby side Brumbies. He came on for Mike Beckham at Tighthead Prop.

In 1999 he was signed by Le Creusot-Montchainin, now Club Olympique Creusot Bourgogne.

International career

He played for Scotland Under 21s against Ireland at Blackrock in 1996, and against France.

References

External links
West of Scotland v Currie, 1995
West of Scotland v Dundee HSFP, 1995
Jed-Forest v West of Scotland, 1995
West of Scotland v Wigtownshire, 1996
West of Scotland v Kilmarnock, 1997
Stirling County vWatsonians, 1998
Stirling County v Boroughmuir, 1998
 Falkirk Tighthead
 Hamilton v Falkirk
 Grangemouth Stags Profile

Living people
Scottish rugby union players
Glasgow Warriors players
Stirling County RFC players
West of Scotland FC players
Ayr RFC players
Glasgow Hutchesons Aloysians RFC players
Falkirk RFC players
Year of birth missing (living people)
Rugby union props